Lithospermum caroliniense, commonly known as the hairy puccoon or Carolina puccoon or Plains puccoon, is a flowering plant found in the Midwestern United States and Canadian provinces surrounding the Great Lakes. The plant grows in sandhills, pine barrens, and dry, sandy woods.

Description
Dr. Robert W. Poole and Dr. Patricia Gentili describe the hairy puccoon as follows:
Flowers large (up to 1 inch in diameter) yellow-orange with 5 petals and basal parts of petals fused into a long corolla tube. Stamens hidden in corolla tube. Flowers arranged in a flat-topped cluster or weakly curled, short sprays. Stem and leaves coarsely hairy. Leaves broadest in the middle, tapering at either end, and outer margin smooth. Plant 1 to 2.5 feet in height.

Cultivation and uses
To cultivate Lithospermum caroliniense a warm sunny position in a moderately fertile well-drained lime-free sandy soil is needed.

A red dye is obtained from the dried or pulverized roots. The powdered root has also been used in the treatment of chest wounds.

References

caroliniense
Plant dyes
Flora of Michigan
Flora of North America
Flora without expected TNC conservation status